Mount Murray is a sharp granite peak with an elevation of , standing  west of Bruce Point on the north side of Mawson Glacier in Victoria Land. First charted by the British Antarctic Expedition (1907–1909) which named it for James Murray, biologist with the expedition.

Mountains of Victoria Land
Scott Coast